HD 215456 is a star in the southern constellation Grus. It is a dim, yellow-hued star that lies just below the normal limit for visibility to the naked eye with an apparent visual magnitude of 6.63. The distance to this star is 129 light years based on parallax, and it has an absolute magnitude of 3.73. It is drifting closer with a radial velocity of −18.9 km/s.

This object is a solar-type main-sequence star with a stellar classification of G0.5V. It is about 7.5 billion years old with a projected rotational velocity of 2.3 km/s. The star has 1.2 times the mass of the Sun and 1.7 times the Sun's radius. The metallicity, or abundance of elements with higher atomic numbers than helium, is slightly below solar. The star is radiating triple the luminosity of the Sun from its photosphere at an effective temperature of 5,818 K.

Planetary system
HD 215456 has two candidate planets that are around 32 and 76 times as massive as the earth with orbital periods of just under 192 and 2226 days, respectively. These were detected by the  HARPS survey in 2011.
The two planets were listed as confirmed on exoplanet.eu in 2020.

References

G-type main-sequence stars
Planetary systems with two confirmed planets
Grus (constellation)
CD-49 13955
215456
112414
J22460804-4858437